Kirzhach is a rural locality (a village) in Nagornoye Rural Settlement, Petushinsky District, Vladimir Oblast, Russia. The population was 138 as of 2010. There are 12 streets.

Geography 
Kirzhach is located 30 km west of Petushki (the district's administrative centre) by road. Zadneye Pole is the nearest rural locality.

References 

Rural localities in Petushinsky District